The First Presbyterian Church is a historic church at 300 E. Main in El Dorado, Arkansas.  The single story brick building was constructed in 1926 for a congregation which was organized in 1846.  The Collegiate Gothic building was built during El Dorado's 1920s boom occasioned by the discovery of oil, and its ensuing rapid growth.  It was designed by the architectural firm R. H. Hunt and Associates.

The building was listed on the National Register of Historic Places in 1991.

See also
National Register of Historic Places listings in Union County, Arkansas

References

Presbyterian churches in Arkansas
Churches on the National Register of Historic Places in Arkansas
Churches completed in 1926
Buildings and structures in El Dorado, Arkansas
National Register of Historic Places in Union County, Arkansas
1926 establishments in Arkansas
Collegiate Gothic architecture in Arkansas
Gothic Revival church buildings in Arkansas